Aristide Letorzec more known under the pen name Lajariette (Nantes, 1808 – Paris, 18 November 1848) was a 19th-century French playwright and 's brother.

Short biography 
Among other plays, he made his actor debut in Zara ou la Sœur de l'Arabe (1837) or Geneviève de Brabant (1838) at the Théâtre des Folies-Dramatiques, before his own plays were presented on the most important Parisian stages of his time, including the Théâtre de la Gaîté, the Théâtre de la Porte-Saint-Martin, and the Théâtre du Vaudeville.

Letorzec was managing director of the Théâtre des Délassements-Comiques from 1843 until his death.

Works 
1839: Allons à la chaumière, vaudeville in 1 act, with Edmond-Frédéric Prieur
1843: Un mauvais père, drama in 3 acts, mingled with song, with Lubize
1843: La Première Cause, drama in 3 acts
1844: Paris diabolique, vaudeville in 1 act
1845: Les Enfants du facteur, drama in 3 acts, with Auguste-Louis-Désiré Boulé
1845: L'Homme et la Mode, comédie-vaudeville in 2 acts, with Lubize
1845: Parlez au portier, vaudeville in 1 act, with Adolphe d'Ennery
1845: Les Ruines de Vaudémont, four-act drama, with Boulé
1848: L'Ange de ma tante, comédie-vaudeville in 1 act, with Alfred Delacour

Bibliography 
 Joseph Marie Quérard, Les Supercheries littéraires dévoilées, 1850, p. 360.
 Joseph Marie Quérard, Félix Bourquelot, Charles Louandre, La Littérature française contemporaine. XIX, 1854, p. 123.
 J.M. Quérard, La France littéraire, 1857, p. 249.
 Henri Rossi, Le Diable dans le vaudeville au XIXe, 2003, p. 27.

19th-century French dramatists and playwrights
French theatre managers and producers
Writers from Nantes
1808 births
1848 deaths